NA-175 Kot Addu is newly created a constituency for the National Assembly of Pakistan. It mainly consists of the city of Kot Addu and the towns of Dera Din Panah and Chowk Sarwar Shaheed of Kot Addu District, areas which were previously in the old NA-176 before the 2018 delimitations.

Election 2018 

General elections are scheduled to be held on 25 July 2018. Independent candidateShabbir Ali Qureshi was elected Member of national assembly from NA*181 Muzaffargarh I.

See also
NA-174 Rahim Yar Khan-VI
NA-176 Kot Addu-cum-Muzaffargarh

References 

Muzaffargarh

Constituencies of Muzaffargarh
Politics of Muzaffargarh
Constituencies of Punjab, Pakistan
Constituencies of Pakistan